Hymerhabdiidae is a family of sponges belonging to the order Agelasida.

Genera:
 Hymerhabdia Topsent, 1892
 Prosuberites Topsent, 1893

References

Sponges